Los Chico crecen may refer to:

 Los Chicos crecen (1942 film)
Los Chicos crecen (1976 film)